Douglas Wakefield (28 August 189914 April 1951) was a British music hall performer and film actor. He is often credited as Duggie Wakefield. He appeared in two films with sister-in-law Gracie Fields, playing her brother in the 1933 comedy This Week of Grace. In 1940 he starred in an espionage comedy-thriller, Spy for a Day.

Selected filmography
 This Week of Grace (1933)
 Look Up and Laugh (1955)
 The Penny Pool (1937)
 Calling All Crooks (1938)
 Spy for a Day (1940)

References

Bibliography 
 Murphy, Robert. British Cinema and the Second World War. A&C Black, 2005.

External links 
 
 Duggie Wakefield and Thomas Thompson

1899 births
1951 deaths
British male film actors
People from Kingston upon Hull